Brachmia dilutiterminella is a moth in the family Gelechiidae. It was described by Aleksey Maksimovich Gerasimov in 1930. It is found in Uzbekistan.

References

Moths described in 1930
Brachmia
Moths of Asia